Soinsee is a lake in Mangfallgebirge, Bavaria, Germany. At an elevation of 1458 m, its surface area is 4.97 ha.

Lakes of Bavaria